Skills Victoria is the Victorian Government body that oversees Victoria's independent TAFE Institutes.

In 2012, the Victorian Liberal/National Coalition, under the leadership of Premier Ted Baillieu made large funding cuts (over $300M) to the TAFE public education system, resulting in many course being cut, campus closures and job losses.

Institutes
Bendigo TAFE
Box Hill Institute
Central Gippsland Institute
Chisholm Institute
East Gippsland Institute
Gordon Institute
Goulburn Ovens Institute
Holmesglen Institute
Kangan Institute
Melbourne Polytechnic
Sunraysia Institute
South West Institute
William Angliss Institute
Wodonga Institute

Universities
Federation University Australia
RMIT University (Royal Melbourne Institute of Technology)
Swinburne University of Technology
Victoria University, Australia

See also
Technical and Further Education

References

External links
 
 TAFE and Training Course Directory